Adolfo José Andrade Chaparro (born 5 January 1950), commonly known as Adolfo Andrade, is a retired Colombian footballer who played as a forward. He is the father of the footballer Andrés Andrade.

Club career
Andrade was born in Tuluá, Valle del Cauca, near to Cali. Andrade played seven seasons for Deportes Quindío and three season for Deportivo Cali, with which won the 1974 Campeonato Profesional. He also played in Deportivo Pereira, Deportes Tolima and Once Caldas, teams with which he had less successful.

International career
Andrade made his debut for the Colombia national team on 26 November 1971 in the 2–1 win against Uruguay, at the 1972 Summer Olympics Qualifying Stage, where he scored the first goal of the match. In the second match, against Venezuela, he scored two goals (the match ended 2–0). He was the goalscorer of the Qualifying Stage with 4 goals in 7 games.

Andrade also played at the Brazil Independence Cup, playing as a starter only in the match against Africa Selection. He was called for the 1974 FIFA World Cup qualification, where he played two matches (both against Uruguay).

Career statistics

Club
This table is incomplete, thus some stats and totals could be incorrect.

International

International appearances

International goals

|}

Honours
Deportivo Cali
Primera A (1): 1974
Runner-up (1): 1972

References

1950 births
Living people
Colombian footballers
Association football midfielders
Deportivo Cali footballers
Deportes Quindío footballers
Deportivo Pereira footballers
Deportes Tolima footballers
Once Caldas footballers
Categoría Primera A players
Colombia international footballers
Sportspeople from Valle del Cauca Department